= Hyper Battle =

Board game

Hyper Battle is a 1981 board game published by Future and Fantasy Games.

== Gameplay ==
Hyper Battle is a tactical space game involving a war between Earth the Alpha Centauri colony.

== Reception ==
W. G. Armintrout reviewed Hyper Battle in The Space Gamer No. 45. Armintrout commented that "Hyper Battle is a bizarre space combat game. It may be challenging, but the challenge lies in memorizing the CRT and deciphering the rationale behind the game. I'd rather stick with science fiction."
